Robert de Ros may refer to:

 Robert de Ros (died 1227), Magna Carta baron
 Robert de Ros (died 1285), ancestor of Barons de Ros